Phase transformation crystallography describes the orientation relationship and interface orientation after a phase transformation (such as martensitic transformation or precipitation).

References

Software to calculate transformation crystallography—PTCLab, http://sourceforge.net/projects/tclab/

Crystallography